Super Hexagon is an indie rhythm video game developed by Terry Cavanagh, with music composed by Chipzel. Originally released for iOS in September 2012, versions for Windows and macOS were released three months later, and Android, BlackBerry and Linux versions followed in early 2013.

The game is based on an earlier prototype by Cavanagh, simply titled Hexagon, which was created for a twelve-hour game jam in early 2012.

Gameplay 

Super Hexagon is a fast-paced twitch game in which the player controls a triangle on a hexagonal grid in the center while walls come from the edges of the screen. The controls are simple: the player must pivot the triangle to the opening in order to survive. The pace of the game progressively gets more difficult the longer the player has survived and to distract players, the game features a chiptune soundtrack, a background that regularly changes color, and walls that occasionally change direction. The game contains six different difficulty levels, beginning at hard (Hexagon), harder (Hexagoner), and hardest (Hexagonest). Additional, "Hyper" difficulty stages can be unlocked by surviving for over sixty seconds on a level.

Development 
Super Hexagon started off as a smaller game prototype titled Hexagon, made and released in one day for the late February 2012 game jam Pirate Kart V. As the game's designer Terry Cavanagh saw potential in the project, he decided to increase the game's difficulty and expand upon its concept. Cavanagh has stated that he is "not much of a visual artist," thus settling on a minimal look quickly. The visuals of Super Hexagon are barely different from its original Hexagon iteration.

Over the course of developing Super Hexagon, Cavanagh had played through it a large amount of time, becoming particularly experienced with the mechanics. During the development of the game, Cavanagh made various changes based on "what felt good", before starting the beta testing process. Cavanagh found that anyone could beat the game once they get better reflexes and a better understanding of the game's mechanics.

Super Hexagon is voiced by journalist Jenn Frank. Cavanagh had intended to use a professional voice actor, but did not like their results and returned to Frank, the voice of Hexagon, to reprise the role. Frank stated that, when a game like Super Hexagon is almost entirely created by a single person, it can become a very personal piece of work; "a product of thousands of tiny decisions, and every one is the reflection of the person who made it, what they're like, and what they think about."

Music

After Cavanagh used Chipzel's track "Courtesy" in the original Hexagon game, he again sought to use her music in the full game Super Hexagon. Chipzel happily obliged, and created a three-track chiptune soundtrack that was subsequently released as Super Hexagon EP. The soundtrack again included the track "Courtesy", as well as "Focus" from Chipzel's previous album Phonetic Symphony and a new track titled "Otis". Each track corresponded to a level in the game: "Courtesy" was used on the Hexagon level, "Otis" on the Hexagoner level, and "Focus" on the Hexagonest level. When a level in Super Hexagon is restarted, the track always starts off at a random place in order to keep players from feeling like they have to start back from the beginning every time.  Fittingly enough, the music that plays in the ending (lasting 60 seconds on Hyper Hexagonest) is a reversed and higher pitched version of Focus.

In late 2015, the EP was re-released on hexagonal vinyl.

Open Hexagon 
Following the game's release, Vittorio Romeo developed Open Hexagon, a spiritual successor designed to be easily customisable. In May 2021, Terry Cavanagh would praise the project in a tweet reading "It's really cool to see that Open Hexagon is still getting regular updates, all these years later - if you liked Super Hexagon and you're interested in what a community driven version looks like, check it out!"

Reception 

Super Hexagon has received a positive critical response with a score of 86/100 on review aggregator website Metacritic for the iOS version and 88/100 for the PC version.

Awards
The game was the runner-up for Apple's App Store "Best of 2012" Game of the Year and was a finalist for the 2013 Independent Games Festival Excellence in Design award (which went to FTL: Faster Than Light) with an Honorable Mention for the Seumas McNally Grand Prize. It was also nominated for "British Game" in the British Academy Video Games Awards in 2013.

See also 
 Impossible Road

References

External links 

 

2012 video games
Action video games
Android (operating system) games
BlackBerry games
Game jam video games
Indie video games
IOS games
Linux games
MacOS games
Monochrome video games
Single-player video games
Video games developed in Ireland
Video games scored by Niamh Houston
Windows games